Lord Warden may refer to:
 Lord Warden of the Cinque Ports, ceremonial official in the United Kingdom
 Lord Warden of the Stannaries, office in the governance of Cornwall
 Lord Warden of the Marches, office in the governments of Scotland and England
 HMS Lord Warden, British warship

See also
 Warden (disambiguation)